Men in War is a 1957 black and white American war film about the Korean War directed by Anthony Mann and starring Robert Ryan and Aldo Ray as the leaders of a small detachment of American soldiers cut off and desperately trying to rejoin their division. The events of the film take place on one day; 6 September 1950. The picture was based on a 1949 World War II novel of the Normandy campaign Day Without End by Van Van Praag that was retitled Combat in 1951. Made soon after the end of the Korean War it was still very much in the minds of the American public.

Some sources claim that credited screenwriter Philip Yordan was actually fronting for the blacklisted Ben Maddow. The Pentagon refused any cooperation with the producer and condemned the film for its depiction of a US Army unit without discipline.

Most of the same cast and crew made God's Little Acre the following year.

Plot
On 6 September 1950, an isolated and exhausted platoon of the 24th Infantry Division is cut off. In addition to losing radio contact, the platoon is harassed by unseen North Korean infiltrators who silently kill the Americans and take their weapons. Platoon leader Lieutenant Benson has only vague instructions to reach a certain hill to link up with American forces.

The patrol stops a jeep driven by Staff Sergeant "Montana" and shell shocked passenger "the Colonel" from the First Cavalry Division. The Colonel is unable to speak and is tied to his seat. After the Battle of the Nakdong River, where "our men fell like rain", the tough experienced Montana decided he and his Colonel, whom he treats like his father, have had enough of the war. Benson commandeers their jeep for his platoon's equipment and the battle-fatigued Corporal Zwickley.

The platoon makes its way towards the hill. Montana disobeys Benson by instinctively shooting a surrendering North Korean sniper, who turns out to have a concealed weapon inside his hat. Sergeant Killian is killed while covering the rear after absentmindedly filling his helmet net with flowers. Montana takes his place and feigns fatigue, luring the infiltrators into the open, where he kills them.

The cynical Montana transforms the platoon back into a military formation while also curing Zwickley's neurosis by slapping him around. The platoon successfully carries on through sniper attack, artillery barrage, and land mines during which Platoon Sergeant Lewis panics and is killed.

When they reach the hill, they find it held by the North Koreans. Montana shoots three enemy soldiers disguised as Americans after a North Korean prisoner is used as bait and killed by his own men. Benson and his men launch an attack, but Montana and the Colonel sit it out. The Colonel comes to his senses, joins the assault, and is killed. Shamed, Montana joins Benson. They use grenades and a flamethrower to destroy a pillbox and machine gun nest.

Only Benson, Montana, and Sergeant Riordan survive. When American reinforcements arrive, Montana produces a container of medals that the Colonel meant to award his men. Benson calls the roll of the men in his platoon in alphabetic order (including those killed in the attack) as Montana throws the medals to the dead on the slope of the hill.

Cast
 Robert Ryan as Lieutenant Benson
 Aldo Ray as Staff Sergeant Joseph R. "Montana" Willomet
 Robert Keith as the Colonel
 Phillip Pine as Sergeant Riordan (as Philip Pine)
 Nehemiah Persoff as Sergeant First Class Nate Lewis
 Vic Morrow as Corporal James Zwickley
 James Edwards as Staff Sergeant Killian
 L. Q. Jones as Staff Sergeant Samuel Davis
 Scott Marlowe as Private Meredith
 Adam Kennedy as Private Maslow
 Race Gentry as Private Haines
 Walter Kelley as Private First Class Ackerman
 Anthony Ray as Private Penelli
 Robert Normand as Private Christensen
 Michael Miller as Private Lynch
 Victor Sen Yung as North Korean Prisoner / Sniper

Production 

Unable to get tanks and military extras from the Pentagon, both Mann and composer Bernstein concentrate on the landscape, in this case filmed at Bronson Canyon. Enemy soldiers are rarely seen, and the isolation of the platoon is strongly conveyed. Mann had previously made film noirs in the late 1940s and Westerns in the early to mid-1950s and combined elements of both in his first war film.

Phil Yordan later recalled he wrote the film at 150 pages then Mann "went through the script, he reduced it to eighty-two pages. He threw out all the dialogue. Of course, I put all of the dialogue back in to get Aldo Ray and Robert Ryan to play it. I said to him, "What am I going to do if you send them this script? They won't show up!"

Notes

External links
 
 
 
 

1957 films
1957 war films
American war films
American black-and-white films
1950s English-language films
Films scored by Elmer Bernstein
Films based on American novels
Films based on military novels
Films directed by Anthony Mann
Korean War films
United Artists films
United States in the Korean War
1950s American films